Entitled is the second studio album by American rapper Torae. It was released on January 15, 2016 by Internal Affairs Entertainment. The guest appearances on the album by Saul Williams, Phonte, 3D Na'Tee, Jarell Perry, Mack Wilds, Teedra Moses, Pharoahe Monch, Roni Marsalis, Shaquawana Shonte, and Kil Ripkin. Production by Pete Rock, Apollo Brown, Jahlil Beats, Illmind, Eric G., Khrysis, DJ Premier, Nottz, Praise, MarcNfinit, E. Jones and Mr. Porter.

Track listing

Samples Used
"Imperial Sound" contains a sample from "What's This World Coming To" by Formula IV.
"R.E.A.L." contains a sample from "To The Establishment" by Lou Bond.
"Together" contains a sample from "Together (We Can Make Something Happen)" by The Individuals.
"Shoutro" contains a sample from "Whole Lot a Love" by Heaven & Earth.
"What's Love" contains a sample from "Ain't Nothing Like The Real Thing" by The Dynamic Superiors.

Charts

References

http://hiphopdx.com/reviews/id.2607/title.torae-entitled
http://www.rapreviews.com/archive/2016_01_torae-entitled.html
http://allhiphop.com/2016/01/20/review-toraes-entitled-proves-new-york-rap-is-very-alive/

2016 albums
Torae albums
Albums produced by Apollo Brown
Albums produced by Mr. Porter
Albums produced by DJ Premier
Albums produced by Illmind
Albums produced by Jahlil Beats
Albums produced by Khrysis
Albums produced by Nottz
Albums produced by Pete Rock